Krzyczki-Pieniążki  is a village in the administrative district of Gmina Nasielsk, within Nowy Dwór County, Masovian Voivodeship, in east-central Poland.

External links
 Jewish Community in Krzyczki on Virtual Shtetl

References

Villages in Nowy Dwór Mazowiecki County